The 1931–32 Montreal Maroons season was the 8th season for the National Hockey League franchise.

Offseason

Regular season

Final standings

Record vs. opponents

Game log

Playoffs
They went against Detroit and won it 3 goals to 1, or 3–1.  They went against Toronto in the second round and lost 4 goals to 3, or 3–4.

Player stats

Regular season
Scoring

Goaltending

Playoffs
Scoring

Goaltending

Note: GP = Games played; G = Goals; A = Assists; Pts = Points; +/- = Plus/minus; PIM = Penalty minutes; PPG = Power-play goals; SHG = Short-handed goals; GWG = Game-winning goals
      MIN = Minutes played; W = Wins; L = Losses; T = Ties; GA = Goals against; GAA = Goals against average; SO = Shutouts;

Awards and records

Transactions

See also
1931–32 NHL season

References

External links

Montreal Maroons seasons
Montreal Maroons
Montreal Maroons